Felix Murray (born 29 October 1998) is a New Zealand cricketer. He made his first-class debut for Central Districts in the 2017–18 Plunket Shield season on 17 March 2018. Prior to his first-class debut, he was named in New Zealand's squad for the 2018 Under-19 Cricket World Cup.

He made his List A debut for Central Districts in the 2018–19 Ford Trophy on 24 October 2018. He made his Twenty20 debut for Central Districts in the 2018–19 Super Smash on 27 December 2018.

References

External links
 

1998 births
Living people
New Zealand cricketers
Place of birth missing (living people)
Central Districts cricketers